"Between Me and You" is the first single from Ja Rule's second album, Rule 3:36. The single features Christina Milian and was released on June 16, 2000 to radio. The song was his first major crossover hit, peaking at #11 on the Billboard Hot 100 singles chart. It also reached number 26 on the UK Singles Chart. The song was produced by Irv Gotti and Lil' Rob.  A version also exists with Ja Rule singing the chorus instead of Christina Milian. The song was released through Def Jam Recordings and Irv Gotti's Murder Inc. Records.

The official remix features a new verse by Ja Rule, Christina Milian's chorus, & verses by Murder Inc. artists Vita, Caddillac Tah, & Black Child. It was released on vinyl singles and the mixtape Features and Lost Tapes, Part 2.

Charts

Weekly charts

Year-end charts

References

2000 singles
Christina Milian songs
Ja Rule songs
Songs written by Irv Gotti
2000 songs
Def Jam Recordings singles
Songs written by Ja Rule